This is a list of Allsvenskan players who have made 200 or more appearances in Allsvenskan. Current Allsvenskan players are shown in blue.

Most matches has Sven Andersson played, 431 matches and most goals has Sven Jonasson, with 254 goals.

Players
Matches of current Allsvenskan players as of 22 January 2015.

References

Players
Association football player non-biographical articles